Phodong Monastery (or Phodang and Podong) is a Buddhist monastery in Sikkim, India.  It is located 28 kilometres from Gangtok.
It was built in the early 18th century but an older monastery had pre-existed the current one.

9th Karmapa was invited by the king of Sikkim, where he founded three monasteries : Rumtek, one of the most important monastery of the Karma Kagyu school of Tibetan Buddhism, Phodong and Ralang Monastery.

It was reconstructed by Sidkeong Tulku Namgyal, who was recognized as the reincarnation of his uncle, Sidkeong Namgyal, the abbot of the monastery. The line was to be continued by Palden Thondup Namgyal

The monastery has a residence of approximately 260 monks and has a numerous collection of some ancient murals.

References

External links 

 Buddhist monasteries in Sikkim
 Karma Kagyu monasteries and temples